Aleksandr Fingert (born 1 May 1965) is a retired Israeli javelin thrower.

His personal best time was 80.18 meters, achieved in September 1989 in Baku, while representing the Soviet Union. He later competed for Israel, and participated at the 1995 and 1997 World Championships. He won the Israeli championship in 1992, 1994, 1995, 1996 and 1997, forming a rivalry with fellow ex-Soviet thrower Vadim Bavikin.

International competitions

References

1965 births
Living people
Soviet male javelin throwers
Russian male javelin throwers
Israeli male javelin throwers
World Athletics Championships athletes for Israel
Soviet emigrants to Israel